In theoretical physics, Van der Waerden notation refers to the usage of two-component spinors (Weyl spinors) in four spacetime dimensions. This is standard in twistor theory and supersymmetry. It is named after Bartel Leendert van der Waerden.

Dotted indices

Undotted indices (chiral indices)

Spinors with lower undotted indices have a left-handed chirality, and are called chiral indices.

Dotted indices (anti-chiral indices)

Spinors with raised dotted indices, plus an overbar on the symbol (not index), are right-handed, and called anti-chiral indices.

Without the indices, i.e. "index free notation", an overbar is retained on right-handed spinor, since ambiguity arises between chirality when no index is indicated.

Hatted indices

Indices which have hats are called Dirac indices, and are the set of dotted and undotted, or chiral and anti-chiral, indices. For example, if

then a spinor in the chiral basis is represented as

where

In this notation the Dirac adjoint (also called the Dirac conjugate) is

See also
 Dirac equation
 Infeld–Van der Waerden symbols
 Lorentz transformation
 Pauli equation
 Ricci calculus

Notes

References
 Spinors in physics

 
 
 

Spinors
Mathematical notation